Patrick Hodgens Hickey (19 January 1882 – 25 January 1930) was a New Zealand trade unionist.

Blackball 1908
Born at Waimea South, near Nelson in 1882. Hickey rose to prominence as Secretary of the New Zealand Federation of Miners and a leader in the Blackball Miners' Union during The 1908 Blackball miners' strike.

In 1921 he stood as Labour's candidate for the Wellington mayoralty, but was heavily defeated by Robert Wright. Hickey unsuccessfully stood for the Auckland City Council on a Labour ticket in the 1923 local elections.

Australia
In 1915, Hickey was the organizer for the Queensland Railways Union and opposed conscription during World War I. He became President of the Melbourne Labor Party in 1926 and was selected for the safe seat of Dandenong, Victoria in 1930 but died in the same year before the election. Hickey was only 48 years old.

Notes

References
 Labour's Path to Political Independence: the Origins and Establishment of the NZLP 1900-19 by Barry Gustafson (1980, Oxford University Press, Auckland)

New Zealand trade unionists
1882 births
1930 deaths
People from the Tasman District
New Zealand Labour Party politicians
Unsuccessful candidates in the 1911 New Zealand general election
Unsuccessful candidates in the 1925 New Zealand general election
New Zealand Socialist Party politicians
New Zealand Labour Party (1910) politicians
United Labour Party (New Zealand) politicians
Social Democratic Party (New Zealand) politicians
New Zealand expatriates in Australia